Benkelman Township is a township in Cheyenne County, Kansas, USA.  As of the 2000 census, its population was 57.

Geography
According to the USGS, it contains one cemetery, Battle Creek.

The streams of Battle Creek, Big Timber Creek and Crosby Creek run through this township.

References
 USGS Geographic Names Information System (GNIS)

External links
 US-Counties.com
 City-Data.com

Townships in Cheyenne County, Kansas
Townships in Kansas